Young Doctors is an Australian factual television show that looks at the work of junior doctors at John Hunter Hospital in Newcastle, New South Wales. This eight-part observational documentary series began on the Nine Network on 26 October 2011.

See also
RPA
The Young Doctors
Medical Emergency

References

External links
Official web site http://channelnine.ninemsn.com.au/article.aspx?id=8292899

Nine Network original programming
2011 Australian television series debuts
2011 Australian television series endings
Australian factual television series
English-language television shows
Television shows set in New South Wales
Australian medical television series